Foinaven is a mountain in Scotland, situated in the far north-west corner of the Scottish Highlands. Like many of the monolithic mountains that surround it, the mountain is within the Moine Thrust Belt and is made up of imbricated layers of Cambrian quartzite which overlie the older Lewisian gneiss basement. The quartzite, being tougher, stood firm when all the surrounding rock was eroded away, leaving the huge mountain isolated. Its highest point is named Ganu Mòr. Foinaven's smaller neighbour is Arkle. Foinaven was formerly thought by some to qualify as a Munro, but an accurate survey in 2007 confirmed that it falls  short of the required .

References

Marilyns of Scotland
Corbetts
Mountains and hills of the Northwest Highlands
Sites of Special Scientific Interest in North West Sutherland